The following is a list of forts in the U.S. state of Tennessee.

Forts in Tennessee

See also

List of international forts
History of Tennessee
List of archaeological sites in Tennessee
Tennessee in the American Civil War

Forts
Tennessee